Alois Schwabl (4 March 1912 – 7 December 1977) was an Austrian athlete. He competed in the men's shot put at the 1952 Summer Olympics.

References

1912 births
1977 deaths
Athletes (track and field) at the 1952 Summer Olympics
Austrian male shot putters
Olympic athletes of Austria
Place of birth missing